Manuel Vicent (born 1936) is a Spanish writer. He was born in La Vilavella, Castellón and studied philosophy and law at the University of Valencia. A prolific author, he has written more than 40 books. He has won several literary prizes, including the Premio Nadal and the Premio Alfaguara, which he won twice.

Prizes
1966: Premio Alfaguara de Novela, for Pascua y naranjas
1979: Premio González-Ruano, for No pongas tus sucias manos sobre Mozart
1986: Premio Nadal, for Balada de Caín
1994: Premio Francisco Cerecedo 
1999: Premio Alfaguara de Novela, for Son de mar

References

Spanish male writers
1936 births
Living people